Juraj Chmiel (born 16 August 1960) is a Czech diplomat. He served as the nation's Minister for European Affairs.

Early life 
Chmiel was born in Budapest but studied in Bratislava and later graduated from the Charles University in Prague. He's married and speaks English, Hungarian, Russian, German, Swahili and Amharic in addition to Czech and Slovak.

Diplomatic career 
He entered the diplomatic corps in 1992 and held several positions within the Ministry of Foreign Affairs. He was specialised in Africa at that time. Chmiel served as the nation's Ambassador to Nigeria from 1996 to 2003 and Australia from 2008 to 2009. From September 2014 to June 2019 he served as Czech Republic Ambassador to Hungary. In June 2019, he took post of Ambassador to Slovenia.

Minister for European Affairs 
Chmiel was nominated to the position by the Civic Democratic Party after the government approved his predecessor's nomination for the European Commission.

References
Leaders Magazine interview

1960 births
Living people
Ambassadors of the Czech Republic to Australia
Ambassadors of the Czech Republic to Hungary
Ambassadors of the Czech Republic to Nigeria
Ambassadors of the Czech Republic to Slovenia
Charles University alumni
Diplomats from Bratislava
Government ministers of the Czech Republic
Civic Democratic Party (Czech Republic) Government ministers